Giuseppe Antonio Fabrini or Fabbrini (c.1740 - c. 1795) was a painter from Florence, Italy, working in fresco and oil on canvas. He studied under Anton Raphael Mengs and is known to have worked in Italy, whilst his works were also collected by the British nobleman George Clavering-Cowper, 3rd Earl Cowper for his country house at Panshanger in Hertfordshire.

External links
http://www.wga.hu/html_m/f/fabbrini/poggio1.html
http://www.wga.hu/html_m/f/fabbrini/index.html
http://www.lostheritage.org.uk/houses/lh_hertfordshire_panshanger.html

18th-century Italian painters
Painters from Florence
1740s births
1790s deaths
Year of birth uncertain
Year of death uncertain